Hyochang-dong is a ward of Yongsan-gu in Seoul, South Korea.

History
Hyochang-dong was named after a place called "Hyochangwon"(located in modern day Hyochang Park). Hyochangwon was the royal tomb of Crown Prince Munhyo, who was the first born of king Jeongjo of Joseon,which was originally located in Gyeonggido, Goyang county, Yulmokdong, which later changed to be part of modern day Hyochangdong Yongsan district.The tombs later moved to Goyang city, where the tombs of Seosamreung is located in. The town was also called hamabigye because it had a stele called the hamabi that requires anyone visiting to step down from a horse.

Attraction
Kim Koo Museum
Hyochang Stadium
Hyochang Park

Education 
 Seoul Keumyang Elementary School
 Automotive High School in Seoul

Transportation 
 Hyochang Park Station of

References

External links
 Official site

Neighbourhoods of Yongsan District